Savea is a Samoan name. Notable people with the name include:

 Ardie Savea (born 1993), New Zealand rugby union player
 Julian Savea (born 1990), New Zealand rugby union player
 Savea Sano Malifa, Samoan poet and journalist

Polynesian masculine given names
Samoan-language surnames